HMAS Snipe (M1102) (formerly HMS Alcaston) was a  which served in the Royal Navy (RN) and Royal Australian Navy (RAN).

Construction
The ship was constructed by John I. Thornycroft and Company at Southampton and launched on 4 September 1952.

Operational history

United Kingdom
The ship was completed on 16 December 1952, and commissioned in the Royal Navy as HMS Alcaston, being allocated the pennant number M.1102. Alcaston served with the 104th Mine Sweeping Squadron, and in November 1956 took part in Operation Musketeer, the Anglo-French attack on the Suez Canal. In 1961 she was sold to Australia along with five other Ton-class minesweepers.

Australia
Following her sale, the ship was refitted with her engines replaced by Napier Deltic diesel engines, stabilisers being fitted and air conditioning added to better suit the ship for Australian service. The ship recommissioned as HMAS Snipe on 11 September 1962.

In September 1963, Snipe took part in Operation Gardening, a large scale operation by Australian minesweepers to clear magnetic mines laid during the Second World War in the approaches to Tonolei harbour, Bouganville. On 10 February 1964, the aircraft carrier  and destroyer  collided, sinking Voyager. Snipe took part in search for survivors from Voyager. During the mid-1960s, Snipe was one of several ships operating in support of the Malaysian government during the Indonesia-Malaysia Confrontation. This service was later recognised with the battle honour "Malaysia 1964–66". Her first tour took place between May 1964 and January 1965, with a second tour lasting from September 1965 to August 1966. On 16 December that year, Snipe was paid off into reserve.

Snipe remained in RAN service until her decommissioning on 3 June 1983.

References

Citations

Sources

Ton-class minesweepers of the Royal Navy
Ships built in Southampton
1952 ships
Cold War minesweepers of the United Kingdom
Ton-class minesweepers of the Royal Australian Navy
Cold War minesweepers of Australia
Ships built by John I. Thornycroft & Company